Pascal Adant (born 8 July 1971) is a Belgian film and television director, screenwriter, producer, animator and composer.

Filmography 
 1998 - Derapages
 1998 - Destination London starring Jean-Paul Comart 
 2001 - Boom
 2002 - Fate
 2005 - Slow Motion
 2008 - Le Vilain Petit Cone Noir
 2008 - Let's Make A Movie
 2009 - Home Sweet Home
 2013 - Sunflower Seed
 2014 - La Fontaine Turns Film-maker, The Crow and the Fox

Awards 
 2nd Prize, The Crow and the Fox at Chicago International Children's Film Festival.

References

External links

 Sunflower Seed on YouTube
 Pascal Adant Website

Belgian film directors
Belgian film producers
Belgian television directors
Belgian television producers
Belgian animators
Belgian animated film directors
Belgian animated film producers
Belgian composers
Male composers
Belgian male musicians
Belgian film score composers
Animation composers
1971 births
People from Soignies
Living people